This is a list of announcers on Japanese television and radio.

TV Stations in Tokyo

Nippon Television Network Corporation - NTV 
 Men
 Tomonori Yamashita
 Takahiko Fujii, host of morning show "Zoom-In Saturday!".
 Shinichi Hatori, host of morning show "Zoom-In Super!" and cast of some variety show.
 Masashi Funakoshi
 Women
 Mika Takanishi
 Yukari Nishio, host of morning show "Zoom-In Super!".
 Noriko Baba, co-host of reality show "The Sekai-gyoten News".
 Tomoyo Shibata, wife of Boston Red Sox player Daisuke Matsuzaka
 Asami Miura

Tokyo Broadcasting System, Inc. - TBS 
 Men
 Ayumi Akaogi
 Toshiyuki Doi, co-host of morning show "Watch!" and sports commentator.
 Tadahiko Sako, co-anchor of "NEWS23 with Tetsuya Chikushi".
 Shinichiro Azumi
 Hiroki Ando, cast of Sunday daytime show "Akko ni Omakase".
 Women
 Maya Kobayashi, entertainment news anchor of "Watch!" and cast of cooking show "Saturday Night Chubou".
 Ikumi Kimura, co-host of morning show "Watch!".
 Hiroko Ogura, co-anchor of "JNN News Forest, The Evening News" (Present: "JNN Evening News").
 Tomoko Kubota, co-host of game show "Amazing Animals".
 Mai Demizu, co-host of game show "Sekai Fushigi Hakken!" and political talk show "Jijihōdan".
 Akiyo Yoshida, co-host of medical program "Last Minute Doctor!"

Fuji Television Network, Inc. - CX

Men
 Tetsuo Suda, co-anchor on evening news program "FNN Supernews".
 Kenji Kawabata, co-anchor on daytime news program "FNN Speak".
 Tetsuo Nagasaka, sports announcer.
 Masaharu Miyake, sports announcer (baseball, martial arts, Formula One, volleyball).
 Tsuneo Shiobara, Formula One announcer.
 Toshihiro Ito, Formula One announcer, a narrator on "Nep League".
 Yutaka Hasegawa, sports commentator, Formula One announcer.
2001
 Hiroki Okada
 Tomoya Morishita
 Kazuhiro Watanabe
2002
 Takuya Watanabe
2003
 Daiki Tanaka
2004
 Taisei Kurata
2005
 Yusho Tabuchi

Women
 Yumi Masuda
2000
 Yaeko Umezu
 Maya Masai
2001
 Sayaka Morimoto
 Aya Takashima - called "Ayapan"
2002
 Hitomi Nakamura
 Minako Nakano
2003
 Saori Ishimoto
 Tsubasa Nagano
 Yoko Tobe
2004
 Maasa Takahashi - reporter of "FNN Supernews Weekend".
 Maiko Saito
2005
 Reiko Endo
 Rio Hirai - Former TV personality "OHA-GIRL Banana"

TV Asahi Corporation - EX 
 Men
 Masahiro Sasaki
 Tomonoshin Kokubo
 Naoki Tsuboi, co-anchor of evening news "ANN Super J Channel".
 Shinichiro Kawamatsu
 Women
 Mayumi Kawase, anchor of ANN News.
 Sayaka Shimohira
 Emi Takeuchi, sports anchor of nightly news program "Houdou Station".
 Mariko Doh, host of live music show "Music Station" with Tamori.

TV Tokyo Corporation - TX 
 Men
 Masaru Akahira
 Tomoki Uekusa
 Women
 Akiko Sasaki, co-anchor of evening news "TXN NewsEye".
 Masumi Chihara

Radio Stations in Tokyo

Nippon Cultural Broadcasting, Inc. - QR 
 Men
 Naomasa Terashima
 Hideaki Oota
 Kunimaru Nomura
 Women
 Junko Suzuki
 Kana Mizutani
 Chiho Fujiki

Nippon Broadcasting System, Inc. - LF 
 Men
 Takashi Tsukagoshi
 Ryohei Sakuraba
 Hideo Matsumoto
 Hisanori Yoshida
 Kohji Iida
 Women
 Eriko Nasu
 Sakaya Masuyama
 Yumi Tashiro
 Yoshiko Kawano
 Mayuko Yamamoto
 Noriko Tomita
 Tomohide Shimbo

Local Broadcasting Stations
Toshifumi Takeshima (Akita Television), play-by-play announcer for the Akita Northern Happinets
Yuichi Uwaizumi (Mainichi Broadcasting System, Inc. (MBS)), on "Seyanen!".
Saki Yagi (MBS), appearing on "Chichin Pui Pui", a news anchor.
Hiroko Matsukawa (MBS), appearing on "Chichin Pui Pui"
Hiroshi Shibata (Asahi Broadcasting Corporation (ABC))
Ukari Kita (ABC), an assistant of "Ohayo Asahi desu" (Good morning.  This is ABC.).
Hiroyuki Yamamoto (Kansai Telecasting Corporation (KTV)), host of "Nambo de Nambo" and "Supernews Anchor".
Yuzuru Okayasu (KTV), a news anchor.
Yasuo Toyota (KTV), a news anchor.
Tetsushi Baba (KTV), a sports announcer (horse racing, baseball, and Osaka International Ledies Marathon)
Keiko Fujimoto (KTV)
Natsumi Sugimoto (KTV)
Anna Kobayashi (Yomiuri Telecasting Corporation (ytv))
Takashi Miura (ytv), appearing on "Zoom-In Super", "Narutomo!", and an announcer on "Japan International Birdman Rally"
Toshiharu Harada (Osaka Broadcasting Corporation (OBC, Radio Osaka))
Toshihiko Fujii (Chukyo TV. Broadcasting Co., Ltd. (CTV))
Others

Former announcers
Free lance announcers
Name (belonged stations)
Akira Fukuzawa (NTV)- host of game show "Maka-joshiki no Ana" (NTV) and comedy show "Enta no Kamisama" (NTV). Also co-anchor of newsmagazine "Bankisha" (NTV) and sports commentator.
Masataka Itsumi (FTN) - died while an active free announcer
Mino Monta (QR) - host of "Mino Monta no Asazuba" (TBS), "Omoikkiri TV" (NTV), "Groovy After School MAX!" (TBS), "Amazing Animals" (TBS), etc.
Etsuko Komiya (EX) - a news anchor at TV Asahi.
Shohei Kuwabara (KTV) - narrator on "Go! Go! Gulliver-kun".
 Kyoko Uchida (CX) - ex co-anchor of late-night sports news "Sport" and host of some variety shows.
Others
Name (belonged stations)
Jun'ichi Sumi (MBS) - one of three hosts of "Chichin Pui Pui".
Shio Chino (CX) - called "Chinopan".
 Sosuke Sumitani (NTV) - he worked as a reporter of Dotch Cooking Show (Produced by ytv) but fired after he was found to have filmed up a schoolgirl's skirt using a mobile camera phone.

List
Announcers